The Romulo Highway or Tarlac–Pangasinan Road, (formerly National Highway 13) is a  major highway in the Philippines that connects the provinces of Tarlac and Pangasinan.

The highway is named after Filipino diplomat, politician, soldier, journalist and author Carlos P. Romulo, who had served, among other things, as President of the United Nations General Assembly from 1949–1950.  Romulo was born in town of Camiling, Tarlac, through which the highway passes.

The entire road forms part of National Route 55 (N55) of the Philippine highway network.

Route description

Intersections

References 

Roads in Pangasinan
Roads in Tarlac